Sagittarius Star Cloud can refer to either:

 Large Sagittarius Star Cloud
 Small Sagittarius Star Cloud